Félix Isisola (born 5 May 1964) is a Peruvian wrestler. He competed in the men's Greco-Roman 82 kg at the 1996 Summer Olympics.

References

1964 births
Living people
Peruvian male sport wrestlers
Olympic wrestlers of Peru
Wrestlers at the 1996 Summer Olympics
Place of birth missing (living people)
20th-century Peruvian people